The Messina Chasmata  are the largest canyon or system of canyons on the surface of the Uranian moon Titania, named after a location in William Shakespeare's comedy Much Ado About Nothing. The - long feature includes two normal faults running NW–SE, which bound a down-dropped crustal block forming a structure called a graben. The graben cuts impact craters, which probably means that it was formed at a relatively late stage of the moon's evolution, when the interior of Titania expanded and its ice crust cracked as a result. The Messina Chasmata have only a few superimposed craters, which also implies being relatively young. The feature was first imaged by Voyager 2 in January 1986.

References 

Canyons and gorges
Surface features of Titania